is the third studio album by singer and cellist Kanon Wakeshima, released February 25, 2015. The album peaked at #30 on the Oricon Albums Chart and stayed on the chart for four weeks.

Track listing

Personnel
 Kanon Wakeshima – vocals, cello, lyrics

References 

2015 albums
Neoclassical albums